Sykologos is a village and a community in the southeastern part of the Heraklion regional unit, in Crete, Greece. Its population in 2011 was 314 for the village, and 396 for the community, which includes the villages Ano Vigla and Tertsa. It is 81.5 km from Heraklion, 16 km from Ano Viannos, 28 km from Ierapetra and 7.5 km from the coastline of the Libyan Sea at Tertsa. Today it is a part of Municipality of Viannos. Olives and bananas are the main crops. The name Sykologos stems from an ancient word for "fig collector".

Population

References

Populated places in Heraklion (regional unit)